Bulbophyllum lichenoides is a species of orchid in the genus Bulbophyllum. This plant is non-poisonous. It is found in New Guinea on trees in range forests at elevations around 800 meters as a mini-miniature sized, warm growing epiphyte with barely noticeable, cylindrical pseudobulbs carrying a single, apical, patent, oblong, obtuse leaf that blooms in the late winter and early spring on an erect, short to 0.12" (3 mm) long, single flowered inflorescence.

Schlechter states that the plant is so small and delicate as to appear to be a lichen and the flowers are the smallest in the section and are either violet red or violet brown with a dark purple lip.

References

The Bulbophyllum-Checklist
The Internet Orchid Species Photo Encyclopedia

lichenoides